The 2013–14 Grand Canyon Antelopes women's basketball team represented Grand Canyon University, during the 2013–14 college basketball season. It was head coach Trent May's seventh season at Grand Canyon. The Antelopes competed as new members of the Western Athletic Conference and played their home games at GCU Arena. This was year 1 of a four-year transition period from D2 to Division I. As a result, the Antelopes were classified as a D2 team for the 2013–14 season. The Antelopes weren't eligible to make the D1 or D2 basketball tournaments and did not participate in this season's WAC basketball tournament. However the Antelopes could have competed in the WNIT or WBI tournaments if they were invited. The Antelopes finished the season third in the WAC and were invited to participate in the WBI.

Roster

Schedule and results
Source

|-
!colspan=9 style="background:#522D80; color:white;"| Exhibition

|-
!colspan=9 style="background:#000000; color:white;"| Regular season

|-
!colspan=9 style="background:#000000; color:white;"| 2014 WBI

See also
2013–14 Grand Canyon Antelopes men's basketball team

References 

Grand Canyon Antelopes women's basketball seasons
Grand Canyon